Araeomolis insignis is a moth of the subfamily Arctiinae first described by Hervé de Toulgoët in 1998. It is found in Ecuador.

References

Moths described in 1998
Phaegopterina
Moths of South America